Anastasios or Athanasios Voulgaris was a Greek revolutionary of Bulgarian origin, from Piyanets, a hero of the Greek War of Independence. Anastasios Voulgaris died in 1839, leaving a widow, a daughter and a son, Leonidas Voulgaris.

References 
''The first version of the article is translated and is based from the article at the Bulgarian Wikipedia (bg:Main Page)

1839 deaths
19th-century Bulgarian people
19th-century Greek people
Greek military leaders of the Greek War of Independence
Greek people of Bulgarian descent